Christine Jeffs (born 29 January 1963) is a New Zealand-born director, editor, and screenwriter.

She is best known for directing the films Rain, Sylvia, and Sunshine Cleaning. Jeffs is also known for her work on television commercials.

Education and career
Jeffs began her career by working locally in post-production, most notably as an assistant film editor. Afterwards, Jeffs went on to attend the Australian Film, Television and Radio School, located in Sydney, Australia. Jeffs obtained a diploma in film editing in 1990, after which she held the position of assistant editor on three feature-length films: Ruby and Rata (1990), Crush (1992), and Absent Without Leave (1992).

Stroke (1993) 
From her work as an assistant editor, Jeffs wrote, directed and edited her first short film Stroke in 1993, which unexpectedly gained attention from film festivals like Cannes and Sundance. Following her success with Stroke, Jeffs began to receive offers to direct commercials.

Rain 
Just under a decade after Stroke, Jeffs returned to film, and had her first feature-length debut as a director with Rain, adapted from a 1994 short novel by Kirsty Gunn of the same name. Premiering at the Cannes Directors Fortnight, Rain was highly praised by critics. The following year, Variety included Jeffs in their annual "10 Directors to Watch" lists.

Sylvia 
In 2003, 2 years after her global success with Rain, Jeffs second feature-length film, Sylvia, was released. Starring Gwenyth Paltrow and Daniel Craig, this film followed the lives of the poets Sylvia Plath and Ted Hughes. Jeffs was requested to take over the project well into production after the previous director left, to which she is stated as saying "[the project] had its blessings and its curses, because it's such a different kettle of fish to become involved with a project at such a late stage – rather than one you sat with and dreamed with and worked on for years." Sylvia was praised by critics.

Sunshine Cleaning 
After Sylvia, Jeffs' third feature-length film, Sunshine Cleaning, was released in 2008 and was written by Megan Holley. The film starred Hollywood actresses Amy Adams and Emily Blunt taking on the roles of two sisters who start a cleaning business specifically for crime-scenes. Alan Arkin also starred in the film as the peculiar father of the two women. Although Sunshine Cleaning was Jeffs' first comedy, she considers her first film, Stroke "kind of funny." Much like Sylvia, Jeffs was brought in as a director after the project had already started.

The Girl Film Company 
Jeffs is said to have co-founded a production company in New Zealand called The Girl Film Company.

Personal life 
Jeffs lives in Auckland, NZ with her partner John Toon, who was the cinematographer on all of Jeffs' films.

Filmography

Awards and nominations

References

External links 

The New Zealand Listener, Issue 8–14 August 2009
New Zealand Film Commission
Christine Jeffs at Exile Films

1963 births
Living people
People from Lower Hutt
New Zealand film directors
New Zealand women film directors